In game theory, a sequential game is a game where one player chooses their action before the others choose theirs. The other players must have information on the first player's choice so that the difference in time has no strategic effect. Sequential games are governed by the time axis and represented in the form of decision trees.

Sequential games with perfect information can be analysed mathematically using combinatorial game theory.

Decision trees are the extensive form of dynamic games that provide information on the possible ways that a given game can be played. They show the sequence in which players act and the number of times that they can each make a decision. Decision trees also provide information on what each player knows or does not know at the point in time they decide on an action to take. Payoffs for each player are given at the decision nodes of the tree. Extensive form representations were introduced by Neumann and further developed by Kuhn in the earliest years of game theory between 1910–1930.

Repeated games are an example of sequential games. Players perform a stage game and the results will determine how the game continues. At every new stage, both players will have complete information on how the previous stages had played out. A discount rate between the values of 0 and 1 is usually taken into account when considering the payoff of each player. Repeated games illustrate the psychological aspect of games, such as trust and revenge, when each player makes a decision at every stage game based on how the game has been played out so far.

Unlike sequential games, simultaneous games do not have a time axis so players choose their moves without being sure of the other players' decisions. Simultaneous games are usually represented in the form of payoff matrices. One example of a simultaneous game is rock-paper-scissors, where each player draws at the same time not knowing whether their opponent will choose rock, paper, or scissors. Extensive form representations are typically used for sequential games, since they explicitly illustrate the sequential aspects of a game. Combinatorial games are also usually sequential games.

Games such as chess, infinite chess, backgammon, tic-tac-toe and Go are examples of sequential games. The size of the decision trees can vary according to game complexity, ranging from the small game tree of tic-tac-toe, to an immensely complex game tree of chess so large that even computers cannot map it completely.

Games can be either strictly determined or determined. A strictly determined game only has one individually rational payoff profile in the 'pure' sense. For a game to be determined it can have only one individually rational payoff profile in the mixed sense.

In sequential games with perfect information, a subgame perfect equilibrium can be found by backward induction.

See also 
Simultaneous game
Subgame perfection
Sequential auction

References 

Game theory
Game theory game classes
Mathematical and quantitative methods (economics)